Socialism or Barbarism is a 2001 book about globalism, U.S. socialism and capitalist systems by Hungarian Marxist philosopher and economist István Mészáros.

It may also refer to: 

 Socialisme ou Barbarie, a French Radical Left group 
 Socialism or Barbarism, a 2001 book by Marxist professor István Mészáros
 Socialismo e Barbarie, an Italian punk rock album
 Rosa Luxemburg's use of the term; see